This is a list of the wool, cotton and other textile mills in Wakefield: including Castleford, Ossett and Pontefract.

Alverthorpe With Thornes (Wakefield)

Horbury

Stanley Cum Wrenthorpe (Stanley)

Wakefield

See also
Heavy Woollen District
Textile processing

References

Footnotes

The National Monument Record is a legacy numbering system maintained 
by English Heritage.
Further details on each mill may be obtained from http://yorkshire.u08.eu/

References

Bibliography

External links

 01
Wakefield
Wakefield
Buildings and structures in Wakefield
Wakefield
Wakefield
History of the textile industry
Industrial Revolution in England